Élise Rivet, also known as Mère Marie Élisabeth de l'Eucharistie (January 19, 1890, Draria, Algeria – March 30, 1945, Ravensbrück concentration camp, Germany) was a Roman Catholic nun and World War II heroine. Rivet volunteered to go to the gas chamber, in place of a mother, in the German concentration camp of Ravensbrück.

Early life
Rivet was born to an Alsatian mother and French naval officer father. After the death of her father in 1910, she moved with her mother to Lyon. She worked for a time in a hair salon before joining the convent of the medical sisters of Notre Dame de Compassion in Lyon in 1912. In 1933 she became Mère Marie Élisabeth de l'Eucharistie, the convent's Mother Superior.

World War II
After the fall of the French Third Republic to Nazi Germany in World War II, she began hiding refugees from the Gestapo and eventually used her convent to store weapons and ammunition for the Mouvements Unis de la Résistance (MUR) at the request of Albert Chambonnet.

On March 24, 1944, she and her assistant were arrested by the Gestapo and taken to the Montluc prison in Lyon. From there, she was taken to Romainville, before being shipped to Ravensbrück concentration camp near Berlin, Germany. There, stripped of her religious garments, she was forced into hard labor. Rivet volunteered to go to the gas chamber on March 30, 1945, in place of a mother only weeks before Germany surrendered unconditionally. She was 55 years old.

Legacy
In 1961, the government of France honored her with her portrait on a Heroes of the Resistance postage stamp. A street bearing her name was inaugurated in Brignais (Lyon) on December 2, 1979. In 1996, she was recognized as Righteous Among the Nations. In 1997, she was posthumously awarded the Médaille des Justes. In 1999, a lecture hall at the Institut des Sciences de l'Homme in Lyon was named Salle Élise Rivet in her honor.

See also
Maximilian Kolbe

References

External links
French-language biographical article
English-language article
Article on philatelic representations of Mère Elise

1890 births
1945 deaths
French Resistance members
Female resistance members of World War II
French women in World War II
French people who died in Ravensbrück concentration camp
People from Algiers
French civilians killed in World War II
People killed by gas chamber by Nazi Germany
20th-century French nuns
French Righteous Among the Nations